Marrying Maiden is the second studio album by San Francisco psychedelic band It's a Beautiful Day, released in 1970 on Columbia Records. Founding member Linda LaFlamme was replaced by keyboardist Fred Webb on this project. Grateful Dead guitarist Jerry Garcia contributed on two tracks and Charlatans member Richard Olsen guested on a track as well.

The album was the band's most successful on the charts, reaching number 28 in the U.S. and number 45 in the U.K.

Critical reception
Lindsay Planer at AllMusic gave the album three stars out of five, writing:

Track listing
 "Don And Dewey" (David LaFlamme) – 5:16
 "The Dolphins" (Fred Neil) – 4:30
 "Essence Of Now" (Mitchell Holman) – 3:20
 "Hoedown" (LaFlamme) – 2:29
 "Soapstone Mountain" (LaFlamme) – 4:20
 "Waiting For The Song" (Hal Wagenet) – 1:03
 "Let A Woman Flow" (LaFlamme, Pattie Santos) – 4:04
 "It Comes Right Down To You" (Fred Webb, Robert Lewis) – 3:14
 "Good Lovin'" (Webb, Holman) – 3:59
 "Galileo" (Wagenet) – 3:02
 "Do You Remember The Sun?" (Webb, Lewis) – 3:14

Personnel

It's a Beautiful Day
 David LaFlamme – lead vocals, violin, guitar, flute 
 Pattie Santos – vocals, backing vocals, percussion
 Fred Webb – keyboards, French horn, backing vocals
 Hal Wagenet – guitar, vocals (spoken)
 Mitchell Holman – bass, mouth harp, backing vocals
 Val Fuentes – drums, backing vocals

Additional musicians
 Jerry Garcia – banjo (track 4), pedal steel guitar (track 8) 
 Richard Olsen – clarinet (track 8)

Production
 Brent Dangerfield, It's a Beautiful Day – producers
 David Brown, John Fiore – engineers

Chart performance

Album

References

1970 albums
It's a Beautiful Day albums
CBS Records albums